The Loveday Pride is the sixth book in the Loveday series written by Kate Tremayne.

Plot summary

With the death of his father, St John Loveday is finally master of Trevowan. But his success is blighted by the presence of his treacherous wife Meriel who, despite being riddled with pox and consumption, manages to cling on to lifelong enough to thwart his plans to marry a rich widow from America. Embittered by his failure, St John soon turns to drink and gambling while his hatred towards his brother continues to fester.

Adam meanwhile has been putting all his energy into rebuilding the ruined estate of Boscabel, which he intends to create as a rival to Trevowan itself.

And on the far side of the world, Gwendolyn races to reach her estranged lover Japhet and give him his pardon. But Japhet has sworn to live an Honorable life, and to return to England with pride. He has made a promise, and pride will not allow him to abandon his obligations.

The girl on the front cover is performance artist, Abi Lake.

2005 British novels
Novels by Kate Tremayne
Novels set in Cornwall
Historical romance novels